Pen-allt is a village within the parish of King's Caple in Herefordshire, England.

External links

Villages in Herefordshire